The Golden Reel Award for Outstanding Achievement in Sound Editing – Music Score and Musical for Episodic Short Form Broadcast Media is an annual award given by the Motion Picture Sound Editors. It honors sound editors whose work has warranted merit in the field of television; in this case, their work in the field of music editing in television. The awards title has gone through many incarnations since its inception, but its focus has been on honoring exemplary work of music editors. The term "short form" was added to the category in 2002, as long form television (over one hour) has its own separate category. The award has been given with its current title since 2018.

Winners and nominees

1990s

2000s

2010s

2020s

References 

Awards established in 1997
Golden Reel Awards (Motion Picture Sound Editors)